Kylix alcyone is a species of sea snail, a marine gastropod mollusk in the family Drilliidae.

Description
The shell grows to a length of 15 mm, its diameter 4.5 mm.

(Original description) The small, slender shell is acute. It is white and polished. It contains about nine whorls (the protoconch decorticated). The suture is distinct, not appressed. The anal fasciole is adjacent to it with no thickened cord between. The whorls are well rounded but the fasciole is flattish. The spiral sculpture consists of (on the early whorls two, on the body whorl about 15) sharply incised lines in front of the shoulder cutting the ribs into squarish segments which are hardly nodulous. On the siphonal canal there are a few finer closet-set threads. The axial sculpture consists of (on the penultimate whorl about 21) rounded somewhat sigmoid ribs, extending from the suture to the base, feeble on the fasciole and the base of the shell and obsolete on the last half of the body whorl. The anal fasciole is wide and shows the arcuate posterior ends of the ribs which do not undulate the suture. The aperture is narrow. The anal sulcus is wide and rounded with a slightly flaring edge. The outer lip is thin, sharp and prominently arcuately produced. The inner lip is erased. The columella is strong and attenuated in front. The siphonal canal is distinct, narrow, and somewhat recurved.

Distribution
This species occurs in the demersal zone of the Pacific Ocean off Cape Lobos, Gulf of California, Western Mexico at a depth of 140 m.

References

  Tucker, J.K. 2004 Catalog of recent and fossil turrids (Mollusca: Gastropoda). Zootaxa 682:1–1295

External links

alcyone
Gastropods described in 1919